Nerian Sharif is an Islamic historic site located in a mountainous area in Azad Kashmir, Pakistan.

List of Custodians

Ghulam Mohiudin Ghaznavi

Ghulam Mohiudin Ghaznavi (1902-1975) was the first custodian of Nerian Sharif.

Muhammad Alauddin Siddiqui

Muhammad Alauddin Siddiqui (1936-2017) was the second custodian.

Sultan Ul Arfeen Siddiqui
Sultan Ul Arfeen Siddiqui is the current custodian, taking over in 2017 after the death of Alauddin Siddiqui.

Shrines
The tombs of Khwaja Pir Ghulam Mohiudin Ghaznavi, his younger brother Khwaja Pir Durab known as Sani la Sani Sarkar Ghaznavi, Alauddin Siddiqui (son of Khwaja Ghaznavi) and many more tombs of the family of Nerian Sharif have been buried in Nerian Sharif.

Location

References

Tourism in Azad Kashmir
Hill stations in Pakistan